XHTY-FM is a commercial radio station located in Tijuana, Baja California, broadcasting to the San Diego-Tijuana metropolitan area on 99.7 FM.  XHTY-FM airs a regional Mexican music format branded as "La Invasora" which in English translates to "The Invader."

XHTY is owned and operated by Uniradio, which operates stations in Baja California and Sonora, though it is programmed from Uniradio's San Diego studios. It broadcasts in the hybrid (digital) HD format.

History
XHB-FM received its concession in December 1964, specifying operation on 92.9 MHz but soon after moving to 99.7. In October 1981, XHB became XHBCN-FM.

In the late 1990s, XHBCN engaged in two call sign changes. It became XHAMR-FM in 1997, and two years later, it became XHTY-FM, taking the original call sign of its sister station, which became XHA-FM.

References

External links
La Invasora 99.7 Official Website

Radio stations in Tijuana
Regional Mexican radio stations